Dendtler Island is an ice-covered island,  long, lying in the eastern part of the Abbot Ice Shelf between Farwell Island and Fletcher Peninsula in Antarctica. It was mapped by the United States Geological Survey from surveys and U.S. Navy air photos, 1960–66, and was named by the Advisory Committee on Antarctic Names for Major Robert Dendtler, United States Army, coordinating officer on the staff of the Commander, U.S. Navy Support Force, Antarctica, during Operation Deep Freeze 1967 and 1968.

See also 
 List of Antarctic and sub-Antarctic islands

References

Islands of Ellsworth Land